Thomas Stephen Walsh (10 January 1925 – 18 May 2003) was a senior Irish police officer (Garda Inspector 9369F) who received the Scott Medal.

Walsh was born near Castlebar, County Mayo, becoming a member of the Garda Síochána on 6 June 1944.

On 14 December 1972, he and Detective Sergeant Myles Hawkshaw were members of a party to carry out a search for firearms at a farm near Dundalk. They encountered four men, three of whom ran off; however, the fourth, armed and wearing bandoliers, aimed at the unarmed Guards. Walsh and Hawkshaw wrestled him to the ground; the gun was found to be fully loaded and ready to fire. A search uncovered three rifles and two bandoliers in a shed.

Both men were awarded the Scott Medal at Templemore in November 1973. Walsh was later promoted to Superintendent, served in the Donegal division, and retired on 17 January 1985.

References

 An Garda Síochána and the Scott Medal, pp. 83–84, Gerard O'Brien, Four Courts Press, Dublin. 

1925 births
2003 deaths
Garda Síochána officers
People from County Mayo
Recipients of the Scott Medal